Thomas Joseph Bradley (January 2, 1870 – April 1, 1901) was an American lawyer and politician who served two terms as a U.S. Representative from New York at the turn of the 20th century.

Biography
Born in New York City, Bradley attended the public schools and was graduated from the College of the City of New York in 1887. He taught in the public schools of New York City from 1887 until 1891 and was graduated from the law department of the university of New York City, in 1889. He was admitted to the bar in 1891 and commenced practice in New York City.

Career
Bradley was Deputy assistant district attorney of the county of New York from 1892 to 1895, then he resumed the practice of law.

Tenure in Congress 
Elected as a Democrat to the Fifty-fifth Congress, winning with 56.84%; and Fifty-sixth Congress, winning with 46.27%; Bradley was United States Representative for the ninth district of New York from March 4, 1897, to March 3, 1901.

Retirement and death 
Not a candidate for renomination in 1900, he then continued the practice of law until his death.

Death
Bradley died from cirrhosis of the liver at St. Vincent's Hospital in Manhattan on April 1, 1901, age 31 years. He is interred at Calvary Cemetery, Woodside, Queens, New York.

References

External links

Govtrack US Congress
The Political Graveyard

1870 births
1901 deaths
City College of New York alumni
Burials at Calvary Cemetery (Queens)
Deaths from cirrhosis
Democratic Party members of the United States House of Representatives from New York (state)
19th-century American politicians